Walter Charles Prozialeck (born August 18, 1952) is an American biomedical educator and scientist. He has written over 100 scientific papers and book chapters. He is known for his research on the toxicity of cadmium, as well as his research on psychoactive drugs and herbal medicine including marijuana and kratom, for which he was interviewed in Rolling Stone Magazine.

Early life and education 
Walter C. Prozialeck was born in Johnstown, Pennsylvania in 1952. He is the son of a coal miner, Bethlehem Steel worker Walter Prozialeck. He attended Forest Hills High School and was All-Conference in Football in 1969. He played guard and was a team captain. He received is undergraduate degree from Juniata College in 1974. Prozialeck earned his Ph.D. from Thomas Jefferson University in 1978 and did a postdoctoral fellowship in the laboratory of Benjamin Weiss from 1978-1980. He was associate professor at the Philadelphia College Of Osteopathic Medicine from 1980-1991.

Career 
Dr. Prozialeck relocated to Chicago in 1991. He joined the faculty at Midwestern University (then Chicago College of Osteopathic Medicine). In 1997 he was promoted to Chairman of the Department of Pharmacology at Midwestern University. In 1999 he was the inaugural recipient of the American Osteopathic Association’s Korr Award for excellence in basic biomedical research. He was awarded the American Osteopathic Foundation Educator of the Year Award in 2010. He was named to Juniata College’s Wall of fame and named a Distinguished Alumni. At Midwestern Prozialeck conducted research on the toxicity of cadmium.  His research helped find early warning signs of kidney damage due to exposure to cadmium. In 2012 Prozialeck began being published about the controversial drug kratom. He opposed of the Drug Enforcement Administration's decision to classify the drug Schedule 1, saying that it would make research on the drug extremely difficult. Researchers stated it would potentially escalate the Opioid Crisis. He was interviewed in Rolling Stone along with several other researchers. The DEA eventually reversed its decision and handed control to the FDA.

Personal life 
He was a rugby player for 25 years and played Club Rugby while at Thomas Jefferson University. Dr. Prozialeck is the father of blues musician Matthew Prozialeck.

References

People from Johnstown, Pennsylvania
1952 births
Living people
Scientists from Pennsylvania
American pharmacologists
Juniata College alumni
Thomas Jefferson University alumni
Midwestern University
Philadelphia College of Osteopathic Medicine alumni